Chad Aaron Chaiyabutr (born 13 December 1991) is a Thai-American professional soccer player who plays as a forward.

Personal life
Chad is the son of Cherdsak Chaiyabutr, who is a former national team player.

External links

1991 births
Living people
Chad Chaiyabutr
Chad Chaiyabutr
Association football forwards
Chad Chaiyabutr
Chad Chaiyabutr
Chad Chaiyabutr
Chad Chaiyabutr
Chad Chaiyabutr
Chad Chaiyabutr
Thai expatriate sportspeople in the United States